Bengali Hindu wedding refers to the traditional Bengali wedding, usually with Hindu rites and rituals native to the Indian subcontinent which has been practiced through centuries. It has almost uncountable rituals that connect culture, mind and families. Some of the most common are:

1. Ashirbad (blessing): Elders from both family visiting each-others home with elders and gifting gold jewellery, sweets as blessings.

2. Gaye holud (Turmeric application): Place turmeric, sandal etc on bride and groom in their home and send essential marriage items and gifts as Sakha (bangles), Sindur(vermilion), fish etc to bless the future couple.

3. Aai buro vaat: It is as said the last rice of single life. Bride and groom are given the best kind of foods there can be by their family.

4. Biddhi: Remembering anchestors of the families and give pindi(offerings) to them by both families separately.

5. Snan (Shower): Women from both families gather together to fetch water, crunch masala(spices) etc to prepare the couple and upcoming wedding.

6. Marriage: A whole series of rituals like shuvo drishti (first eye contact blessing), mala bodol( exchanging necklace), suddhi(mental cleansing), Gatbandhan(hand and scarf tieing), konnadan(father tranfering the gotro of brides to the grooms), joggo and montro uccharon( fire blessing and chanting), sidur(applying vermilion, fera( circeling fire) etc.

7. Kalrat (unlucky night): spending nights awaken.

8. Biday and reieve: Bride leaving with groom and accepted as Goddess Lakshmi (deity of fortune) to the in grooms house. Plays games during house tours.

9. Vat kapor (rice cloth): Groom serves plate full of foods and new sarees(cloths) to bride and swears to bear her all possible expences.

10. Oshtomongol (8th day blessing): The couple comes to brides house for a visit on the eighth day.

There are other rituals that may vary from places and circumstances but the basic is same connection of soul through all these acts which flourishes the conjugal life.

See also
 Bengali Muslim wedding
 Gaye Holud
 Culture of West Bengal
 Culture of Bangladesh
 Wedding in Bangladesh

References

Wedding Bengali Hindu
Marriage in Hinduism
Marriage, unions and partnerships in Bangladesh
Weddings by culture